P. danae may refer to:
 Planctoteuthis danae, a squid species
 Pyrgocythara danae, a sea snail species

See also
 Danae (disambiguation)